Anna Emilia Auvinen (born 2 March 1987) is a Finnish footballer who plays as a defender for the Finland women's national team. She previously played for NiceFutis, FC Honka and HJK of the Naisten Liiga.

Club career
In August 2019 Auvinen agreed a transfer from HJK to Inter Milan of the Italian Serie A.

International career
Auvinen made her debut for the Finland women's national team on 7 April 2017, in a 1–0 defeat by Poland in Pruszków.

References

External links
 
 Anna Auvinen at SoccerDonna 
 Anna Auvinen profile at Football Association of Finland (SPL) 

1987 births
Finnish women's footballers
Finnish expatriate footballers
Living people
Finland women's international footballers
Kansallinen Liiga players
Expatriate women's footballers in Italy
Finnish expatriate sportspeople in Italy
Helsingin Jalkapalloklubi (women) players
PK-35 Vantaa (women) players
Women's association football defenders
Serie A (women's football) players
Inter Milan (women) players
FC Honka (women) players
NiceFutis players
People from Pieksämäki
Sportspeople from South Savo
U.C. Sampdoria (women) players
UEFA Women's Euro 2022 players